"Natural Attraction" is a song originally recorded by American country artist Billie Jo Spears. It was composed by Dennis Linde and Alan Rush. Released as a single via United Artists Records, it reached the top 40 of the American country chart in 1980. It was the second single spawned from Spears's 1980 album Standing Tall.

Background, recording, and release
Billie Jo Spears had a series of commercially successful years during the seventies, including the number one single "Blanket on the Ground" (1975) and the top ten single "Misty Blue" (1976). She continued having top 20 singles through 1981. One of her final top 40 singles on the label was 1980's "Natural Attraction". The song was written by Dennis Linde and Alan Rush. It was recorded at the Jack Clement Recording Studio in Nashville, Tennessee. The session was produced by Larry Butler.

"Natural Attraction" was first included as an album track on Spears's 1980 studio album titled Standing Tall. It was then spawned as its second single in June 1980 by United Artists Records. It was backed on the B-side by the song "You Could Know as Much About a Stranger". It was distributed as a seven-inch vinyl disc. The song debuted on the American Billboard Hot Country Songs chart. It spent a total of nine weeks there, peaking at number 39 in August 1980.

Track listing
7" vinyl single
 "Natural Attraction" – 3:23
 "You Could Know as Much About a Stranger" – 3:14

Charts

References

1980 singles
1980 songs
Billie Jo Spears songs
United Artists Records singles
Song recordings produced by Larry Butler (producer)
Songs written by Dennis Linde